Nina Morgan may refer to:

Nina Morgan, fictional character in Cuckoo (TV series)
Nina Morgan, fictional character in The Love Boat: A Valentine Voyage, played by Shanna Reed
Nina Morgan, fictional character in Midsomer Murders, played by Genevieve O'Reilly

See also
Nina Morgan-Jones, fashion stylist